Frumerie is a Swedish family. The family descends from Martin Frumerie, who came to Sweden with Louis de Geer in 1635. The family originates in southern Belgium, in the province of Hainaut.

Martin's name was spelled also Framerie, de Framerie, de la Framerie, Delaframerie and Fremery. He signed a contract with Louis de Geer on 19 July 1635, to become the school teacher and reformed preacher of Finspång forge. Since he signed the contract as Frumerie, this is considered the correct form by the Swedish branch of the family. They sailed to Sweden from Leiden. Martin's son David Frumerie (1641–1677) was a painter and gilder working at Drottningholm Palace. One of Martin's brothers, Kalmar län Josua Frumerie (1637–1712), was the father of Caleb Frumerie (1670–1738), who went with Charles XII to Bender and Poltava before being kinghted as de Frumerie in 1718.

The brother of David and Joshua Frumerie, Johan Frumerie (1634–89), was bailiff in Nora fögderi (Ör) from 1668 to 1676. In 1681 he became mayor of Nora. He represented Nora at the Riksdag. By 1675 he owned most of Vedevågs forge in Linde (Ör). Among his sons was Per Frumerie (1662–1713), district attorney in Örebro County. Per was the grandfather of sea captain Gustaf de Frumerie (1849–1936), whose wife was sculptor Agnes de Frumerie.

Per's brother Johan Frumerie (1663–1709) was mountain bailiff in Nora bergslag. He was the father of Johan Frumerie (died 1756), secretary of the Admiralty in Karlskrona. Johan was the grandfather of engraver and lithographer Mauritz Frumerie.

Johan's brother, lieutenant Per Frumerie (1697–1767) was the great-grandfather of architect Gustaf de Frumerie. Gustaf was the father of, among others, pianist and piano educator Ragnhild Maria de Frumerie (1907–1988), composer and pianist Gunnar de Frumerie, and cellist Carin de Frumerie-Luthander.

The name de Frumerie was also adopted by the children of a niece of Gustaf's father, among whom was opera singer and painter Ossian Frumerie.

Prominent members of the family
 David Frumerie (1641–1677), painter
 Mauritz Frumerie (1775–1853), engraver and lithographer
 Agnes de Frumerie, née Kjellberg (1869–1937), sculptor
 Gustaf de Frumerie (1872–1947), architect
 Gunnar de Frumerie (1908–1987), composer and pianist

Prominent people related to the family
 Anne Sofie von Otter (born 1955), mezzo-soprano 
 Nina Stemme (born 1963), dramatic soprano

References

Swedish-language surnames
Swedish families
Swedish families of Walloon ancestry